NGC 905 is a lenticular galaxy with an active nucleus in the constellation Cetus south. It is estimated to be 644 million light-years from the Milky Way and has a diameter of approximately 85,000 ly. NGC 905 was discovered by astronomer Francis Leavenworth.

See also 
 List of NGC objects (1–1000)

References

External links 
 

Lenticular galaxies
Cetus (constellation)
0905
009038